Jarin Blaschke (born September 28, 1978) is an American cinematographer, best known for his work on the psychological horror film The Lighthouse, which earned him a nomination for the Academy Award for Best Cinematography.

When he was 16, Blaschke moved to New York City to study film at the School of Visual Arts.

Blaschke first rose to prominence with his work on Robert Eggers' directorial debut The Witch. His work received acclaim, in addition to several film critic association nominations, including the Seattle Film Critics Society Award for Best Cinematography. He would reteam with Eggers for The Lighthouse, which was filmed in black and white negative. In addition to his Academy Award nomination, Blaschke won the Independent Spirit Award for Best Cinematography, and was nominated for the BAFTA and Critics' Choice Award.

Filmography
Film

Television

Awards and nominations

References

External links

American cinematographers
School of Visual Arts alumni
1978 births
Living people